Perlamantis alliberti is a species of praying mantis in the family Amorphoscelidae.  It is native to the Iberian Peninsula.

See also
List of mantis genera and species

References

Mantidae
Endemic insects of the Iberian Peninsula
Insects described in 1843